Mazar of Al-Mazar may refer to:

Mazar (mausoleum); often but not always Muslim mausoleum or shrine.

Places
Mazar (toponymy), a component of Arabic toponyms literally meaning shrine, grave, tomb, etc.
Mazar, Afghanistan, a village in Balkh Province
Mazar, Xinjiang, a farm in Taxkorgan Tajik Autonomous County, China
Mazar, Arzuiyeh, Kerman Province, Iran
Mazar, Vakilabad, Arzuiyeh County, Kerman Province, Iran
Mazar, Baft, Kerman Province, Iran
Mazar, Markazi, Iran
Mazar, Razavi Khorasan, Iran
Mazar, South Khorasan, Iran
Mazar, Zirkuh, South Khorasan Province, Iran
Al-Mazar, Jenin
Al-Mazar, Haifa
Almazar (town), Uzbekistan
Al Mazar al Shamali, Jordan

Other
Mazars, a French-based professional services company.
Mazar (surname)

See also 

 Mazor (disambiguation)
 Mazer (disambiguation)